Assail Bank is a bank in South Passage of the Houtman Abrolhos, in the Indian Ocean off the coast of Western Australia. 

References

Houtman Abrolhos